Aristodemo Santamaria (9 February 1892 – 10 December 1974) was an Italian footballer who played as a forward. With the Italy national football team, he competed in the men's tournament at the 1920 Summer Olympics.

References

External links
 
 FIGC Profile 

1892 births
1974 deaths
Italian footballers
Italy international footballers
Olympic footballers of Italy
Footballers at the 1920 Summer Olympics
Footballers from Genoa
Association football forwards
Genoa C.F.C. players
U.S.D. Novese players